Sikaicha     is a village development committee in the Himalayas of Taplejung District in the Province No. 1 of north-eastern Nepal. At the time of the 2011 Nepal census it had a population of 2,250 people living in 417 individual households. There were 1,066 males and 1,184 females at the time of census.

Sikaicha gbs is generally called golden village, because of this gbs is very wealthy income support from (alaichi)and generated in the British Army since decate till now.  People are very kind and optimist personalities, such as politics, teachers, drs and high levale of people.

References

External links 
 UN map of the municipalities of Taplejung District

Populated places in Taplejung District